The Grand Mosque in Makhachkala (Yusuf Bei Cami) is the main mosque of the Republic of Dagestan. It is supposed to have been patterned after the Sultan Ahmed Mosque in Istanbul. The building can accommodate up to 17,000 worshipers. Its construction was financed by Turkey. The mosque was completed and consecrated in 1998. It is the focal point of the city's main thoroughfare, Imam Shamil Avenue.

The construction of the mosque was started in 1991 thanks to the financing of one of the wealthy Turkish families. The Blue Mosque in Istanbul was taken as a model. The grand opening took place in 1997. The first imam was the Turk Hafiz Aydin.

In 2004-2007 the building was reconstructed in order to increase its capacity to 15 thousand people. In July 2007, a telethon was held in Makhachkala, thanks to which more than 25 million rubles were collected to expand the mosque and improve the surrounding area.

The current imam since 2021 is Muhammad Atangulov.

See also 
Islam in Russia
List of mosques in Russia
List of mosques in Europe

References

External links 
 
 

Makhachkala
Religious buildings and structures in Dagestan
Mosque buildings with domes
Mosques completed in 1998
Makhachkala
Mosques in Russia
Islam in the Caucasus